Ivan Tarkhanov may refer to:
 Ivan Tarkhanov (painter) (1780–1848), Russian painter
 Ivan Tarkhanov (physiologist) (1846–1908), Georgian physiologist